5 Seconds of Summer is the debut studio album by Australian pop rock band, 5 Seconds of Summer. It was released by Capitol Records on June 27, 2014 in Europe and on July 22, 2014 in the United States, Mexico, and Canada. The album was supported by four singles: "She Looks So Perfect", "Don't Stop", "Amnesia", and "Good Girls". Musically, the album is rooted in the pop-punk, pop-rock and power-pop genres. Before the album's release, the band was the opening act for One Direction in from 2013-2015 on three of their concert tours. To promote the album, 5 Seconds of Summer embarked on their first global headlining tour, entitled Rock Out with Your Socks Out Tour, between May and September 2015.

Singles
"She Looks So Perfect" was released on February 21, 2014 as the lead single from the album. The lead track peaked at number one on the Australian Singles Chart, New Zealand Singles Chart, Irish Singles Chart and the UK Singles Chart. The single also peaked at number 24 on the Billboard Hot 100 and number 25 on the Canadian Hot 100. It was certified triple platinum by the Australian Recording Industry Association (ARIA), double platinum by Recording Industry Association of America (RIAA), and platinum by both Recorded Music New Zealand and British Phonographic Industry.

"Don't Stop" was released as the second single on May 9, 2014. It went number one in New Zealand, Ireland, Scotland, and Ukraine. It also peaked at number two in the UK and number three in Australia and Spain. It was certified gold by ARIA and RIAA.

"Amnesia" was released as the third single on July 15, 2014. It peaked at number three in Spain and Ireland, number five in Scotland, number six in New Zealand and Denmark, and number seven in Australia and the UK. It was certified double platinum by ARIA and platinum by RIAA.

"Good Girls" was announced as the fourth single from the album on October 6, 2014. It was originally released as the album's first promotional single. It was released as an official single on October 10, 2014, the same day its official music video premiered. It peaked in the top 20 in Ireland, New Zealand, the UK, and Australia. It was certified gold by RIAA.

Promotional singles
"Kiss Me Kiss Me" was released as the second promotional single. It peaked at number 10 in New Zealand and number 14 in Australia while also charting in Canada, the Netherlands, and the United States.

"Everything I Didn't Say" was released as the final promotional single and peaked at number 24 on the Billboard Hot 100, number 11 in Australia, number 8 in New Zealand, and number 36 in the Netherlands.

Critical reception

On Metacritic, which assigns a rating out of 100 reviews from mainstream critics, the album gained an average score of 65. This was based on 10 reviews, indicating "generally favorable reviews". On AllMusic, the album was given a 3.5 star rating out of 5. The album was praised for having "hummable melodies that anyone over 30 will probably feel slightly guilty for remembering" and songs with "a catchy chorus." Evan Lucy of Alternative Press said, "no one will argue 5 Seconds Of Summer is high art, but it ultimately works more often than it doesn’t. And perhaps most important of all, it feels authentic." He ended off stating, "these songs are awash in live drums and real instruments proves 5 Seconds Of Summer want to rock as much as they want to reach Top 40 crowds." Jason Lipshutz of Billboard praised songs such as "Don’t Stop", "Good Girls", "18" and "Mrs. All American" for their "tight songwriting and lyrical wit." He also complimented producer John Feldmann for his "clean and compact" work on the album. He finished off stating, "Overall, 5 Seconds of Summer is a delightful debut from a group that cannot be easily pigeonholed, and is worth paying attention to."

In December 2021, the album was listed at no. 17 in Rolling Stone Australia’s ‘200 Greatest Albums of All Time’ countdown.

Commercial performance
In the United States, the album debuted at number one on the Billboard 200, with first-week sales of 259,000 copies, the biggest first-week sales for a debut album by a group since Daughtry's self-titled album in 2006. 5 Seconds of Summer is the first Australian act to achieve a number-one album with their debut album. The album has sold 734,000 copies in the United States as of September 2015.

The album peaked at number one in 14 countries. It was certified platinum in four countries, and gold in ten other countries.

Track listing

Notes
 signifies an additional producer
"Lost Boy" replaces "English Love Affair" on the Australian version of the album.
"Mrs All American" replaces "English Love Affair" on the US version of the album.

Personnel
Credits adapted from the CD liner notes.

5 Seconds of Summer
 Luke Hemmings – rhythm guitar (all tracks), lead and backing vocals (all tracks)
 Michael Clifford – lead guitar, keyboards, backing vocals (all tracks), lead vocals (tracks 2-3, 5-6, 8-9, 11, 13-16, 18, 20)
 Calum Hood – bass guitar, backing vocals (all tracks), lead vocals (tracks 1-15, 17-20)
 Ashton Irwin – drums, percussion, keyboards, backing vocals (all tracks), lead vocals (tracks 3, 8-9, 11, 15, 19)

Additional personnel
"She Looks So Perfect"
Eric Valentine – additional production, mastering
Justin Long – assistant recording engineer

"Don't Stop"
Chris Lord-Alge – mixing
Luke Potashnick – additional programming
Ted Jensen – mastering

"Good Girls"
John Feldmann – producer, mixing, recording
Zakk Cervini – engineering, editing, programming, additional production, mixing
Bunt Stafford-Clark – mastering

"Kiss Me Kiss Me"
John Feldmann – producer, mixing, recording
Alex Gaskarth - co-writer
Chris Qualls – assistant
Bunt Stafford-Clark – mastering

"18"
John Feldmann – producer, mixing, recording
Chris Qualls – assistant 
Bunt Stafford-Clark – mastering

"Everything I Didn't Say"
John Feldmann – producer, mixing, recording
Chris Qualls – assistant
Bunt Stafford-Clark – mastering

"Beside You"
Joel Chapman – producer
Louis Schoorl – producer
John Feldmann – additional production, mixing
Bunt Stafford-Clark – mastering

"End Up Here"
John Feldmann – producer, mixing, recording
Alex Gaskarth - co-writer
Tommy English – engineering, editing, programming, additional production, 
Chris Qualls – assistant
Bunt Stafford-Clark – mastering

"Long Way Home"
John Feldmann – producer, mixing, recording
Alex Gaskarth - co-writer, additional backing vocals
Tommy English – engineering, editing, programming, additional production, mixing
Bunt Stafford-Clark – mastering

"Heartbreak Girl"
Steve Robson – producer, mixing
Sam Miller – mixing
Luke Potashnick – additional programming
Bunt Stafford-Clark – mastering

"English Love Affair"
Rick Parkhouse (Red Triangle) – programming, percussion, gang vocals, producer
Bunt Stafford-Clark – mastering

"Amnesia"
Sam Watters – producer
Bunt Stafford-Clark – mastering

"Social Casualty" (Deluxe edition)
John Feldmann – producer, recording
Bunt Stafford-Clark – mastering

"Never Be" (Deluxe edition)
John Feldmann – producer, mixing, recording
Colin Brittain – engineering, editing, programming, additional production, mixing
Chris Qualls – Assistant
Bunt Stafford-Clark – Mastering

"Voodoo Doll" (Deluxe edition)
John Feldmann – producer, mixing, recording
Chris Qualls – assistant
Bunt Stafford-Clark – mastering

"Tomorrow Never Dies" (Target edition)
Colin Brittain – engineering, editing, programming, additional production, mixing
Tommy English – engineering, editing, programming, additional production, mixing
Chris Qualls – assistant
Bunt Stafford-Clark – mastering

"Independence Day" (Target edition)
John Feldmann – producer, mixing, recording
Zakk Cervini – engineering, editing, programming, additional production, mixing
Nick Furlong – songwriting
Bunt Stafford-Clark – mastering

"Close as Strangers" (Target edition)
George Tizzard (Red Triangle) – producer
Rick Parkhouse (Red Triangle) – producer
Bunt Stafford-Clark – mastering

"Out of My Limit" (Target edition)
Bunt Stafford-Clark – mastering

A&R
Jo Charrington
Nick Raphael

Photography
Tom Van Schelven

Art direction and design
Richard Andrews

Charts

Weekly charts

Monthly charts

Year-end charts

Certifications

Release history

References

2014 debut albums
Albums produced by John Feldmann
Albums produced by Steve Robson
Albums produced by Louis Biancaniello
Albums produced by Sam Watters
Albums produced by Jake Sinclair (musician)
Capitol Records albums
5 Seconds of Summer albums